Koper is a city in Slovenia.

Koper may also refer to:
 Koper (surname)
 Koper (film)
 Koper, Malakand, a commune in Pakistan
 Koper Department, a commune in Burkina Faso
 FC Koper, a football club in Koper, Slovenia
 RK Koper, a handball club in Koper, Slovenia
 Radio Koper, a radio station in Koper, Slovenia

See also